The giant bushy-tailed cloud rat or Luzon bushy-tailed cloud rat (Crateromys schadenbergi) is a large, endangered species of rodent in the family Muridae. Relatively little is known about its behavior, but it is nocturnal, mainly arboreal and feeds on various types of vegetation.

It is rarer than the northern Luzon giant cloud rat, a shorter-haired species that mainly occurs at lower elevations, but locally the giant bushy-tailed cloud rat remains moderately common in oak-pine forest. The primary threats are hunting and habitat loss.

The appearance of the giant bushy-tailed cloud rat has been described as spectacular, and it appears to be an equivalent of large tropical tree squirrels, which are not found in Luzon. The very long, soft fur, which also covers the tail, is typically all black, but some individuals have white patches.

References

External links
 

Rats of Asia
Crateromys
Endemic fauna of the Philippines
Fauna of Luzon
Rodents of the Philippines
Mammals described in 1895
Taxonomy articles created by Polbot